Payton Ridenour (born May 29, 2002) is an American female BMX rider.

Cycling career 
She is a seven-time BMX national champion who qualified to compete in the 2020 Olympics. She was the youngest competitor in her event, in which she finished 17th. In May 2021, she earned her first BMX Supercross World Cup podium, a second place finish in Bogotá, Colombia.

Personal life 
Ridenour is the only child. Her father, Keith is a former amateur BMX racer.

Ridenour has published a children's book.

References

External links 
 
 
 
 

2002 births
Living people
BMX riders
American female cyclists
Olympic cyclists of the United States
Cyclists at the 2020 Summer Olympics
21st-century American women